The 2019 Czech Athletics Championships was the 27th edition of the national outdoor track and field championships for the Czech Republic. It took place from 26 to 27 July 2019 at the stadium in the Pod Palackého Stadium in Brno, organized by the local club AC Moravská Slavia Brno.

Results

Men

Women

References

Results
 Mistrovství ČR mužů a žen na dráze. atletika.cz. Retrieved 2019-09-07.

External links
 Czech Athletics Federation website

Czech Athletics Championships
Czech Athletics Championships
Czech Athletics Championships
Czech Athletics Championships
Sport in Brno